Promynoglenes is a genus of Polynesian sheet weavers that was first described by A. D. Blest in 1979.

Species
 it contains six species, found in New Zealand:
Promynoglenes grandis Blest, 1979 – New Zealand
Promynoglenes minuscula Blest & Vink, 2003 – New Zealand
Promynoglenes minuta Blest & Vink, 2002 – New Zealand
Promynoglenes nobilis Blest, 1979 (type) – New Zealand
Promynoglenes parvula Blest, 1979 – New Zealand
Promynoglenes silvestris Blest, 1979 – New Zealand

See also
 List of Linyphiidae species (I–P)

References

Araneomorphae genera
Endemic fauna of New Zealand
Linyphiidae
Spiders of New Zealand
Endemic spiders of New Zealand